Moreau is a town in Saratoga County, New York, United States. The population was 13,826 at the 2000 census.  The town is located in the northeast part of the county, north of Saratoga Springs. Moreau is named after Jean Victor Moreau, a French general, who visited the area just before the town was formed. The town contains a village called South Glens Falls.

History 
The town, although part of the town of Northumberland until 1805, was first settled around 1766 at what is now the village of South Glens Falls.

Grant Cottage State Historic Site, the last home of Ulysses S. Grant, former President and army general, is on the grounds of Mt. McGregor Correctional Facility.  Grant spent the last weeks of his life there, finishing his memoirs.

The Historical Society of Moreau and South Glens Falls is housed in the Parks-Bentley House, added to the National Register of Historic Places in 1994.

The Royal Blockhouse site was listed on the National Register of Historic Places in 2012.

Geography

The town's entire northern and eastern boundaries are established by the Hudson River. The eastern town line, formed by the river, is the border of Washington County.  The northern town line is the border of Warren County.

The Adirondack Northway (Interstate 87) and US Route 9 are north-south highways which pass through the town.  New York State Route 32 intersects US-9 at the hamlet of Fernwood, and New York State Route 197 intersects NY-32 at the hamlet of Reynolds Corners.

Demographics

At the 2000 census there were 13,826 people, 5,128 households, and 3,543 families living in the town.  The population density was 327.9 people per square mile (126.6/km).  There were 5,395 housing units at an average density of 128.0 per square mile (49.4/km).  The racial makeup of the town was 94.07% White, 3.58% African American, 0.20% Native American, 0.38% Asian, 0.02% Pacific Islander, 1.03% from other races, and 0.72% from two or more races. Hispanic or Latino of any race were 2.09%.

Of the 5,128 households 32.8% had children under the age of 18 living with them, 55.4% were married couples living together, 10.1% had a female householder with no husband present, and 30.9% were non-families. 24.4% of households were one person and 10.8% were one person aged 65 or older.  The average household size was 2.53 and the average family size was 3.01.

The age distribution was 23.9% under the age of 18, 6.9% from 18 to 24, 34.0% from 25 to 44, 22.5% from 45 to 64, and 12.8% 65 or older.  The median age was 37 years. For every 100 females, there were 107.3 males.  For every 100 females age 18 and over, there were 107.3 males.

The median household income was $40,536 and the median family income  was $47,788. Males had a median income of $35,660 versus $25,321 for females. The per capita income for the town was $19,492.  About 4.7% of families and 7.1% of the population were below the poverty line, including 6.6% of those under age 18 and 8.3% of those age 65 or over.

Communities and locations in Moreau 
 Bakers Falls – a small waterfall on the Hudson River near Fenimore.
 Clarks Corner – A location in the southeastern part of the town on NY-32. It was named after early physician Billy Clark.
 Ashford Estates – A neighborhood community off Rt. 9 in the southern tier of the town.
 Fenimore – A hamlet east of South Glens Falls.
 Fernwood – A hamlet  starting from the south of the village of South Glens Falls, running along Moreau’s western border of the Hudson River to the north side of Nolan Road, then across Route 9 along the north side of Bluebird Road to Main Street Ext. then back to the village line.
 Fortsville – A hamlet in the southwestern part of the town.
 Grant Cottage State Historic Site
 Moreau Lake – A lake located west of Fortsville.
 Moreau Lake State Park – A state park in the southwestern part of the town.
 Mount McGregor Correctional Facility (closed) – A New York State prison by the western part of the town.
 Reynolds Corners – A hamlet south of South Glens Falls on NY-32 at NY-197.
 South Glens Falls – A village located by the northern town line on US-9, adjacent to the Hudson River.

References

External links
 Town of Moreau
  Early history of Moreau
 Moreau Town Court
 1866 Map of Fortsville hamlet

Towns in Saratoga County, New York